The British Academy Television Award for Best Soap and Continuing Drama is one of the major categories of the British Academy Television Awards (BAFTAs), the primary awards ceremony of the British television industry, presented by the British Academy of Film and Television Arts. Eligible drama series must be transmitted for at least 20 episodes a year. Only one episode of no more than an hour may be entered, and the episode selected must not be a special, as it must be fully representative of the series. The award was first given in 1999, for soap operas transmitted in 1998. Its title was changed from Best Soap to Best Continuing Drama in 2003, and to Best Soap and Continuing Drama in 2012. , the award has been won by EastEnders nine times, Coronation Street seven times, Casualty four times, Emmerdale three times, and The Bill and Holby City once each.

Winners and nominees

1990s

2000s

2010s

2020s

 Note: The series that don't have recipients on the table had Production team credited as the recipients of the award or nomination.

Eligible programmes

Former eligible shows were Crossroads, The Bill, Brookside, Take the High Road, Family Affairs and Night and Day The Royal Today and Holby City.

Total awards by network

 BBC One – 12

 ITV/ITV1 – 9

Programmes with multiple wins and nominations

Multiple wins

Multiple nominations

References

External links
 BAFTA Awards at the Internet Movie Database

Soap and Continuing Drama
British drama
Soap opera awards
1999 establishments in the United Kingdom
Awards established in 1999